Statistics of Swedish football Division 3 for the 1933–34 season.

League standings

Uppsvenska 1933–34

Östsvenska 1933–34

Mellansvenska 1933–34

Nordvästra 1933–34

Södra Mellansvenska 1933–34

Sydöstra 1933–34

Västsvenska 1933–34

Sydsvenska 1933–34

Footnotes

References 

Swedish Football Division 3 seasons
3
Sweden